Footfairy (2020) is a crime-thriller Hindi language film directed by Kanishk Varma and produced by Anurag Bedi, Ruchir Tiwari and Nithin Upadhyaya. It starrs Gulshan Devaiah, Sagarika Ghatge, Kunaal Roy Kapur, Muskan Bamne, Karan Arvind Bendre, Ashish Pathode, Shamal Rokade and Yogesh Soman.

Cast 
 Gulshan Devaiah as CBI Inspector Vivan Deshmukh
 Sagarika Ghatge as Devika
 Shonita Joshi as Anisha Kulkarni
 Kunaal Roy Kapur as Jashua Matthews
 Ashish Pathode as Harsh
 Taneea Rajawat as Rita Madhav

Plot 
Footfairy movie is story of a psychopath killer who takes away feet of girls with himself after brutally killing the victim  by asphyxiation. CBI Inspector Vivaan Deshmukh (Gulshan Devaiah)  is assigned for the mission knock down the killer. Vivaan nabs Joshua Matthews as the prime suspect but lacks of evidence to arrest. At the end, Vivaan gets help of a kid to reach to the killer on a railway track.

Soundtrack 
The movie has three songs recorded at Zee Music Company by music director Jeet Gannguli.

Release 
Footfairy trailer was released on 7 October 2020 and the film was released on &pictures on October 24, 2020. A week later it is released on Netflix India.

Reception 
Rishita Roy Chowdhury for India Today rated the movie 4 out of 5 stars and wrote "Footfairy is paced impressively. As soon as one attempts to crack the identity of the serial killer, the story turns. One is kept guessing throughout the run of the film, until the very closing scene." Moumita Bhattacharjee of Rediff.com found Footfairy a intriguing and shocking movie. Bhattacharjee wrote in her review "The performances are nuanced and not a single character is without a purpose. Gulshan Devaiah takes time to grow on you because he isn't the usual brooding police officer with a dark past. There's no back story here, just the investigation." Binge rated 2.5/5 and wrote "Footfairy has very few artists. None of them has a full-fledged role in making an impact." Rating 3/5 stars Shubham Kulkarni for Koimoi wrote "Footfairy puts these corpses in a giant suitcase. Why is that point not investigated? There are many such loopholes and loose ends that are not concluded well." Ruchi Kaushal of Hindustan Times felt upset about the disappointing ending and writes "Even if the maker wants to not just highlight the obsession of the footfairy but also of a CBI officer obsessed with finding the culprit, the film feels pointless". Sreeju Sudhakaran for LatestLY wrote "Hell, Quentin Tarantino, Wes Anderson and Anurag Kashyap have made a career out of that. But it would become less of a homage and more of a lifting-off, when your third act is almost similar to that of Memories of Murder". Vishal Verma for Glamsham wrote "FootFairy is a rare dark psychological de noir thriller that unfolds in layers and conveys the irony of the ‘unseen’ human face."

Reference

External links

2020s Hindi-language films
Indian crime thriller films
Indian remakes of South Korean films